Mycobacterium houstonense is a member of the Mycobacterium fortuitum third biovariant complex. The specific epithet houstonense refers to Houston, Texas, where the first isolate of the M. fortuitum third biovariant (sorbitol-positive) was identified.

References

External links
Type strain of Mycobacterium houstonense at BacDive -  the Bacterial Diversity Metadatabase	

Acid-fast bacilli
houstonense
Bacteria described in 2004